de Clerc may refer to various surnames.

de Klerk, Klerk, de Klerck, and Klerck are surnames, including:
Frederik Willem de Klerk (born 1936), former President of South Africa.
LeClerc, Leclerc, Le Clerc (for North-Americans of French descent only) and le Clerc are typical French or Francophone surnames.
Leclercq and Le Clercq are surnames.
Declercq
De Clercq
Clerck
De Clerck
Clerc, surname